The Pallisers is a 1974 BBC television adaptation of Anthony Trollope's Palliser novels. Set in Victorian era England with a backdrop of parliamentary life, Simon Raven's dramatisation covers six of Anthony Trollope's novels and follows the events of the characters over two decades.

The series featured a huge cast of prominent and rising actors.

Plot
The series begins with the story of Lady Glencora (Susan Hampshire), fiancée of the dry, aristocratic Plantagenet Palliser (Philip Latham) who will inherit the title of the Duke of Omnium and Gatherum from his uncle (Roland Culver). Although they marry, Lady Glencora still pines for her unsuitable but handsome admirer Burgo Fitzgerald (Barry Justice).

Palliser becomes aware of this situation and takes his wife on a long tour of Europe, even though he had recently been offered the position of Chancellor of the Exchequer, the one political position he craves. While on their grand tour, the newlyweds come to a better understanding, and upon their return to London Glencora becomes an ambitious society hostess.

Whilst Plantagenet succeeds in his political aspirations, Irish barrister Phineas Finn (Donal McCann) is elected to Parliament for the family seat of Loughshane. In London, Finn rises quickly in high society and falls in love with Lady Laura Standish (Anna Massey) who is struggling to maintain her lifestyle after paying off the debts of her brother, Lord Chiltern (John Hallam).

Lady Laura marries Robert Kennedy (Derek Godfrey), a wealthy Scottish MP and Finn is forced to resign after a defeat on the Irish Tenant Right. Lady Laura's marriage collapses and she moves to Germany. Finn spends Christmas with Lady Laura only to be accused of adultery by Kennedy. Finn is later arrested for murder but the Pallisers finance his defence.

Episode synopsis'The Pallisers' at trollopesociety.org, retrieved 5 February 2018

1 to 6
Alice Vavasor cannot decide which man she loves - the upright but boring John Grey or the dashing but unreliable cousin George, whom she turned down once already; Glencora's love for Burgo Fitzgerald and her marriage to Plantagenet Palliser. These episodes cover more or less the ground of Trollope's first Palliser novel, Can You Forgive Her?.

7 to 11
The start of Phineas Finn's political career and love for Lady Laura Kennedy, then Violet Effingham. Just as Phineas screws up his courage to ask Lady Laura to marry him, she forestalls him by telling him she has accepted Finn's fellow parliamentarian Robert Kennedy's proposal of marriage. Finn turns to the beautiful Violet Effingham who is also pursued by her childhood sweetheart and Lady Laura's brother, Lord Chiltern. The Duke of Omnium courts Madame Max Goesler. Covers the events in the second of Trollope's Palliser novels, Phineas Finn.

12 to 19
The Eustace Diamonds disappear and Lizzie Eustace is embroiled in a society scandal. The Duke of Omnium dies and Plantagenet and Lady Glencora inherit the title. Phineas Finn (M.P.) is accused of the murder of a fellow M.P. and Madame Max arrives in Prague to find evidence to prove his innocence. Squeezes into 8 episodes the main events of Trollope's Palliser novels The Eustace Diamonds and Phineas Redux.

20 to 26
Plantagenet Palliser becomes Prime Minister. Lady Glencora becomes a society hostess. It concludes with the death of Glencora, and the story of the marriages of the children. These episodes cover the events of the last two of Trollope's Palliser novels, The Prime Minister and The Duke's Children.

Cast (partial)

Anthony Ainley: Rev. Emilius
Terence Alexander: Lord George
Anthony Andrews: Lord Silverbridge
Sarah Badel: Lizzie Eustace
Robin Bailey: Prime Minister Gresham
George Ballantine: Smithers
Kenneth Benda: Major Domo
Donald Bisset: Doctor
Sydney Bromley: Mr Clarkson
Edward Burnham: Mr. Turnbull
Antony Carrick: Superintendent Worth
Anna Carteret: Lady Mabel Grex
Dallas Cavell: Captain Colepepper
Helen Christie: Lady Monk
Jeremy Clyde: Gerard Maule
Michael Cochrane: Lord Gerald Palliser
James Cossins: Sergeant Bunfit
Brenda Cowling: Mrs Bunce
Roland Culver: Duke of Omnium and Gatherum
Iain Cuthbertson: Major Mackintosh
Veronica Doran: Bonteen's maid
Fabia Drake: Countess of Midlothian
Gareth Forwood: Everett Wharton
Sonia Dresdel: Marchioness of Auld Reekie
Donald Eccles: Squire Vavasor
Sheila Fay: Mrs. Meager
Lynne Frederick: Isabel Boncassen
John Glyn-Jones: John Vavasor
Derek Godfrey: Robert Kennedy
Gordon Gostelow: Mr Scruby
John Hallam: Lord Chiltern
Susan Hampshire: Lady Glencora Palliser
Edward Hardwicke: Prince of Wales
Rachel Herbert: Lady Dumbello
Jeremy Irons: Frank Tregear
Derek Jacobi: Lord Fawn
Martin Jarvis: Frank Greystock
Hayden Jones: Mr. Bunce
Alan Judd: Archbishop
Barry Justice: Burgo Fitzgerald
Penelope Keith: Mrs Hittaway
Jo Kendall: Adelaide Palliser
Rosalind Knight: Aspasia Fitzgibbon
Philip Latham: Plantagenet Palliser
Roger Livesey: Duke of St. Bungay
Desmond Llewelyn: Speaker
Angus MacKay: Mills Happerton
Leonard Maguire: Andy Gowran
Mel Martin: Violet Effingham
John Scott Martin: Bunce's Crony
Anna Massey: Lady Laura Kennedy
Donal McCann: Phineas Finn
Denis McCarthy: Doctor
Barbara Murray: Marie Goesler, usually known as Madame Max Goesler; then married as Marie Finn
Caroline Mortimer: Alice Vavasor
Jay Neill: Photographer
John Nettleton: Mr Fothergill
Máire Ní Ghráinne: Mary Flood
Kate Nicholls: Lady Mary Palliser
Arnold Peters: Policeman
Donald Pickering: Dolly Longstaffe
Ellen Pollock: Lady Baldock
Bryan Pringle: Mr Monk
Maurice Quick: Collingwood
George Raistrick: Member of Parliament
Edwin Richfield: Police Sergeant
John Ringham: Major Tifto
Clifford Rose: Quintus Slide
Sheila Ruskin: Emily Wharton
Peter Sallis: Mr Bonteen
Norman Shelley: Prime Minister Mildmay
John Slavid: Head Croupier
Michael Spice: Inspector Staple
Neil Stacy: Lawrence Fitzgibbon
John Stratton: Mr Bott
Stacey Tendeter: Girl in Street
Gary Watson: George Vavasor
Moray Watson: Barrington Erle
Lockwood West: Lord Brentford
June Whitfield: Mrs Bonteen
Wendy Williams: Jane
Stuart Wilson: Ferdinand Lopez

Crew
Director: Hugh David and Ronald Wilson
Adaptation: Simon Raven
Script Editor: Lennox Phillips
Designer: Raymond Cusick

Production
Novelist Simon Raven presented the idea of an adaptation of the Pallisers novels to a BBC2 editor and began working on the script in 1969. Raven admitted he may have offended "Trollope purists" by the additions and subtractions he made. "The most obvious way I have bent Trollope's scheme in the six books is to maintain the relationship between Glencora and Plantagenet throughout the serial. A television serial needs a hero and heroine, and at the expense perhaps of Trollope's own plan, I have blown them up to give them more lasting significance than he indicated."
 
Production stretched over 13 months and the series was transmitted at the height of industrial strikes, marked by Three-Day Weeks and power shortages at the start of the year. A sudden general election called for February 1974 resulted in the postponement of the series as it dealt with political storylines heavily featuring the Liberal Party, albeit completely fictional. The series resumed, but a second general election in October 1974 caused further transmission challenges. All this contributed to scheduling difficulties and though the series was meant to have finished in June, the final two episodes didn't go out until November (because of strikes at the BBC).

The series was partly financed by the American Time-Life Films and, in its first presentation in the United States, was the first weekly series of extended length to be screened on pay-television which had previously principally screened films and sport. The then new Home Box Office (HBO) paid a reported $500,000 for a one-year screening licence.

Reception
The series followed the dramatisation of John Galsworthy's Forsyte cycle of novels in The Forsyte Saga (1967). Both projects share the Victorian time period, the multi-generational narrative and the six-month length of the series. Some writers at the time termed it 'Son of Forsyte', although it did not have the impact of the earlier series. The series was re-edited to 22 episodes for its 1970s screenings in the United States on PBS. 

Reviewing the series in The Daily Telegraph for its 2015  rebroadcast, Gerald O'Donovan wrote: "In a world where BBC drama tends to be commissioned in taste-testing dribs and drabs of three or six episodes the mere fact that this is a 26-parter seems to imbue The Pallisers with a relaxed, witty confidence that's hard to find in TV drama now". However, he concluded that "The Pallisers, for all its pleasures, is a bauble left over from more extravagant TV times." Neil Clark, in an article for The Guardian the following year, commended this costume drama as "the best of them all" when it was repeated once more. In Clark's opinion: "The Pallisers stands as a reminder of how satisfying television drama can be when writers, producers and directors concentrate on emotion instead of editing, and don't underestimate their audience."

Impact

In 1978, Pallister Drive in Hillsborough, Auckland was named after the television series.

DVD release
All episodes of The Pallisers are available on DVD in Australia, the United Kingdom and North America.

References

External links
BBC programme

BBC television dramas
Television series set in the 19th century
Period television series
1970s British drama television series
1974 British television series debuts
1974 British television series endings
English-language television shows
Anthony Trollope